Fakhrabad (also Romanized as Fakhrābād) is a village in Garkan Rural District, Garkan-e Jonubi District, Mobarakeh County, Isfahan Province, Iran. At the 2006 census, its population was 1,545, in 404 families.

References 

Populated places in Mobarakeh County